Jafarabad (also Romanized as Ja‘farābād; also known as Boneh Golī) is a village in Anarestan Rural District, Chenar Shahijan District, Kazerun County, Fars Province, Iran. At the 2006 census, its population was 144, in 37 families.

References 

Populated places in Chenar Shahijan County